Alasdair Steele-Bodger  (1 January 1924 – 17 September 2008) was a British veterinary surgeon.

Early life and education
Steele-Bodger was born in Lichfield, Staffordshire, the son of Harry Steele-Bodger, also a noted vet, and the elder brother of Micky Steele-Bodger, another vet and also England international rugby player. He was educated at Shrewsbury School before reading Natural Sciences at Gonville and Caius College, Cambridge and qualifying as a vet at the Royal (Dick) Veterinary School, University of Edinburgh.

Career
Steele-Bodger practised as a Veterinary Surgeon in Lichfield from 1948 until 1977 and then for two years in Fordingbridge, Hampshire.  In 1979 he was appointed Professor of Veterinary Clinical Studies at the University of Cambridge, a post which he held until 1990.

Steele-Bodger was President of the British Small Animal Veterinary Association in 1962, President of the British Veterinary Association from 1965 to 1966 and President of the Royal College of Veterinary Surgeons in 1972 to 1973.

Honours
Steele-Bodger was appointed a CBE in 1980.

Marriage and children
Steele-Bodger married Anne Finlayson in 1948 and they had three daughters.

Death
Steele-Bodger died in Monmouth on 17 September 2008 at the age of 84.

References

External links 
 http://www.poolhousevets.co.uk/alasdair_steele.html
 The Independent
 http://www.timesonline.co.uk/tol/comment/obituaries/article4862741.ece

1924 births
2008 deaths
People from Lichfield
People educated at Shrewsbury School
British veterinarians
Alumni of Gonville and Caius College, Cambridge
Alumni of the University of Edinburgh
Academics of the University of Cambridge
Commanders of the Order of the British Empire
Fellows of the Royal College of Veterinary Surgeons